All India Minorities Front is a political party in India, based amongst the Muslim minority. The party president is S.M. Asif.

AIMF advocates a negotiated solution to the Ayodhya issue.

In the Delhi Legislative Assembly elections in 1998 AIMF supported the Indian National Congress.

In the election to Lok Sabha 1999 AIMF had two candidates, the female candidate Afaque Parvin in Lucknow (628 votes, 0,08%) and Sanjoy Sachdev in New Delhi (177 votes, 0,08%).

In the Lok Sabha elections 2004 AIMF had one candidate, Amir Haider Khan from Balrampur (Uttar Pradesh). He got 4 874 votes (0.7%).

In the Jammu and Kashmir Legislative Assembly elections 1996 AIMF had two candidates, who together got 1 699 votes.

AIMF ditrubutes the Dr Aruna Asaf Ali Sadbhawana Award annually.

References

Political parties of minorities
Islamic political parties in India